Johannes Chrisos Tomus Simorangkir (February 17, 1922 – July 5, 1991) is an MP of Indonesia from the Indonesian Christian Party. He was also the Member of the People's Representative Council of Mutual Assistance from 1967 until 1971, and the head of Indonesian Christian Party from 1962 until 1973.

Early life 
Simorangkir was born on 17 February 1922 in Tarutung, North Sumatra. He began his studies at the Tarutung Elementary School in 1937. After finishing his studies, he moved to Surakarta. In Surakarta, he studied for his Junior High School at the Hollands Inlandsche Kweekschool in 1942. He moved again to Jakarta, in which he became the student at the Law Faculty of the University of Indonesia. He graduated from the University in 1953. After obtaining a bachelor's degree, he studied again thirty years later at the Andalas University in Padang, and earned a magister degree.

Organization 
He began his career during his university years by joining the Indonesian Christian Youth Movement (PPKI) and the Association of Indonesian Christian Intelligence (PIKI). He became the chairman of PPKI from 1955 until 1965, and the chairman of PIKI from 1963 until 1969.

Career

Political career 
His political career begin when he was elected as the member of the Constitutional Assembly of Indonesia from the Indonesian Christian Party (Parkindo) in the 1955 elections, on which he served from 1956 until 1959. He would later be re-appointed as the member and the head of the Parkindo fraction in the People's Representative Council of Mutual Assistance.

Educational career 
Since 1956, he applied to the University of Indonesia as the Professor of Constitutional Law, with his application always delayed. Without a clear reason, several professors rejected to be his promotor. When Ismail Suny, his former student, became the Professor of the Law Faculty, Simorangkir applied for the position again. The application ended with his rejection.

He began teaching in the military world as the lecturer at the Indonesian National Armed Forces Staff and Command School (SESKO ABRI) from 1978 until 1982. He was also the Rector of Christian University of Indonesia from 1962 until 1966.

In the National Law Development Agency (BPHN) 
He entered BPHN since its name was National Law Development Institution in 1958. He became the chairman of BPHN from 1966 until 1982.

Family 
Simorangkir was married to Basaria Simorangkir. She was the chairwoman of the Indonesian Christian Women's Association, and the Head of National Daily Board of the 1945 Generation. The marriage resulted in six children.

Death 
Simorangkir died on July 5, 1991 at the age of 69. He left a wife, six children, and six grandchildren.

References

Bibliography 

1922 births
1991 deaths
Indonesian Christians
People from North Tapanuli Regency